Urumpirai Saiva Tamil Vidyalayam ( Urumpirāy Caivattamiḻ Vittiyālayam) is a provincial school in Urumpirai, Sri Lanka.

See also
 List of schools in Northern Province, Sri Lanka

References

External links
 Urumpirai Saiva Tamil Vidyalayam

Provincial schools in Sri Lanka
Schools in Jaffna District